Newhouse railway station served the hamlet of Newhouse, North Lanarkshire, Scotland from 1888 to 1930 on the Airdrie to Newhouse Branch.

History 
The station opened on 2 July 1888 by the Caledonian Railway. To the southeast was the goods yard and to the south of the northbound platform was the signal box, which closed in 1922. The station closed on 1 December 1930.

References

External links 

Disused railway stations in North Lanarkshire
Former Caledonian Railway stations
Railway stations in Great Britain opened in 1888
Railway stations in Great Britain closed in 1930
1888 establishments in Scotland
1930 disestablishments in Scotland